The following is a list of notable events, births and deaths from 2020 in the United States.

The US was heavily impacted by the COVID-19 pandemic, which by the end of the year killed over 300,000 people within American borders. America also became a political battleground for various issues, with various instances of racism and more so police brutality commencing a wide movement of racial unrest and the George Floyd protests.

Donald Trump was a central figure to American politics during his final full year as president, which saw not only the pandemic and racial unrest but also Trump's first impeachment trial and the appointment of Amy Coney Barrett to the Supreme Court. While Trump lost the 2020 election to former Vice President Joe Biden, he has disputed the result of the election, and efforts have continued into both 2021 and 2022 to overturn the election.

Incumbents

Federal government
 President: Donald Trump (R-Florida)
 Vice President: Mike Pence (R-Indiana)
 Chief Justice: John Roberts (New York)
 Speaker of the House: Nancy Pelosi (D-California)
Senate Majority Leader: Mitch McConnell (R-Kentucky)
 Congress: 116th

Ongoing events
COVID-19 pandemic in the United States
2020–2021 United States racial unrest
2020 United States elections

Events by month

January 
 January 1
Iraqi militiamen and protesters disperse from the site of the U.S. embassy in Baghdad a day after attacking it.
Recreational marijuana becomes legal in Illinois.
Several new regulations take effect in the United States, including new regulations on retirement funds, new minimum wage rules, and new overtime rules.
All books and films published in 1924 enter the public domain in the United States.
 January 3 – 2019–2021 Persian Gulf crisis: President Donald Trump approves the targeted killing of Iranian general Qasem Soleimani and Iraqi paramilitary leader Abu Mahdi al-Muhandis in Baghdad, Iraq.
 January 5 – The 77th Golden Globe Awards are held in Beverly Hills, California.
 January 6 – Former film producer Harvey Weinstein is charged with four additional counts of rape and sexual battery in a Los Angeles court.
 January 8
Persian Gulf crisis: Iran attacks Iraqi military bases hosting U.S. troops, injuring more than 110 service members.
The American Cancer Society reports a 2.2% drop in the cancer death rate between 2016 and 2017, the largest single-year decline in mortality for this disease ever recorded in the U.S.
 January 9
Persian Gulf crisis: The House of Representatives votes 224–194 to pass a non-binding War Powers Resolution to limit the president's ability to pursue military actions against Iran without congressional consent.
The Justice Department reportedly finds "nothing of consequence" in its two-year investigation into the business dealings of former Secretary of State Hillary Clinton.
 January 10 – For the first time since the Great Recession, women outnumber men in the American workforce, with women holding 50.04% of all jobs.
 January 11
Puerto Rico is hit by a 5.9 earthquake and several 5.0 earthquakes, following the 7 January 6.4 that left one dead and several wounded in addition to thousands without electric power.
At least seven people are killed by wind and rain storms across the South.
 January 14
The seventh Democratic presidential debate is held in Des Moines, Iowa. Six candidates participate.
The Women's National Basketball Association and its players' union reach an eight-year agreement allowing top players to earn $500,000 with an average salary of $130,000. It also provides fully paid maternity leave.
Delta Air Lines Flight 89, en route to Shanghai, dumps fuel on a school playground near Los Angeles International Airport. 60 people, including 17 children, are treated for skin irritation.
 January 15 – President Donald Trump and China's Vice Premier Liu He sign the U.S.–China Phase One trade deal in Washington, D.C.
 January 16 – The impeachment trial of President Donald Trump begins in the U.S. Senate.
 January 20 – 22,000 people attend a gun rights rally at the Virginia State Capitol in Richmond to protest proposed gun laws.
 January 21 – COVID-19 pandemic: The first case of COVID-19 in the United States is confirmed by the Centers for Disease Control and Prevention (CDC).
January 22 – The Oakland Raiders officially relocate to Las Vegas, Nevada.
 January 24 – Donald Trump becomes the first sitting president to personally attend the annual March for Life anti-abortion protest in Washington, D.C.
 January 26  
A helicopter crash in Calabasas, California kills nine people, including basketball star Kobe Bryant and his 13-year-old daughter Gianna Bryant.
The 62nd Annual Grammy Awards are held in Los Angeles, California, hosted by Alicia Keys.
 January 28
 Fotis Dulos attempts suicide at his home in Connecticut; gets airlifted to a Bronx hospital where he would die 2 days later.
 January 29
COVID-19 pandemic: President Donald Trump establishes the White House Coronavirus Task Force.
President Trump signs the United States–Mexico–Canada Agreement (USMCA).
 January 30 – COVID-19 pandemic: The CDC confirms the first case of human-to-human transmission of the COVID-19 coronavirus in the U.S.
 January 31
COVID-19 pandemic: President Donald Trump imposes travel restrictions preventing foreign nationals from entering the U.S. if they visited China within the previous two weeks.
The U.S. Senate votes 51–49 against calling witnesses in President Trump's impeachment trial.
President Trump expands his travel ban to include six new countries: Eritrea, Kyrgyzstan, Myanmar, Nigeria, Sudan, and Tanzania.
At a human trafficking summit in the White House, Trump reportedly creates a new White House position dedicated solely to addressing the issue.

February 

February 2 – Super Bowl LIV: The Kansas City Chiefs defeat the San Francisco 49ers, 31–20. Jennifer Lopez and Shakira co-headline the halftime show.
February 3 – The 2020 Iowa Democratic and Republican caucuses take place. The Democratic caucus results are delayed due to problems with a vote-counting app.
February 4 – President Donald Trump delivers his third State of the Union address. Among the guests are Venezuelan opposition leader Juan Guaidó and conservative radio host Rush Limbaugh, who is awarded the Presidential Medal of Freedom.
February 5 – The impeachment trial of President Donald Trump concludes with the Senate voting 52–48 to acquit on the first article of impeachment and 53–47 on the second charge. Utah Senator Mitt Romney becomes the first ever senator to vote to remove a president of their own political party.
February 6 – The National Highway Traffic Safety Administration (NHTSA) gives permission for Nuro Inc. to deploy up to 5,000 driverless delivery vehicles across the country. It is the first time the NHTSA allows deployment of automated driving systems without meeting all national auto safety standards.
February 9 – The 92nd Academy Awards, the second in a row with no official host, are held at Dolby Theatre in Hollywood. Bong Joon-ho's Parasite becomes the first South Korean film to receive Academy Award recognition, winning four awards as well as becoming the first non-English-language film to win Best Picture; Joon-ho also wins Best Director. Todd Phillips' Joker leads the nominations with 11, with Joaquin Phoenix winning Best Actor. Renée Zellweger wins Best Actress for Judy, Brad Pitt Best Supporting Actor for Once Upon a Time in Hollywood and Laura Dern Best Supporting Actress for Marriage Story. The telecast garners over 23.6 million viewers, a 20% decrease from the previous year, at that point the lowest viewership for the ceremony since Nielsen began compiling figures.
February 10 – Former Congressman J. C. Watts launches the first all-news channel aimed at African Americans, the Black News Channel.
February 11 – The 2020 New Hampshire primaries are held.
February 13 – The McClatchy newspaper chain files for Chapter 11 bankruptcy.
February 17
COVID-19 pandemic: More than 300 Americans are evacuated from the quarantined Diamond Princess cruise ship in Japan, including 14 who have tested positive for the COVID-19 coronavirus.
The national Boy Scouts of America files for Chapter 11 bankruptcy. Independently funded local councils are not effected.
Pier 1 Imports files for Chapter 11 bankruptcy and plans to do so in Canada as well.
Amazon CEO Jeff Bezos pledges $10 billion to fight climate change using a new fund called the Bezos Earth Fund.
February 19 – The Utah Senate votes to decriminalize polygamy.
February 20 – Political consultant Roger Stone is sentenced to 40 months in prison after being found guilty of witness tampering, obstructing an official proceeding, and five counts of making false statements.
February 21
 Wells Fargo agrees to pay a $3 billion fine as a result of the 2016 fake account scandal.
 Hunters debuts on Amazon Video.
February 22 – The 2020 Nevada Democratic presidential caucuses are held. The Republican caucuses are cancelled with President Trump winning all delegates by default.
February 23 – Ahmaud Arbery is murdered in Glynn County, Georgia. No arrests are made until May.
February 24 – Former film producer Harvey Weinstein is found guilty of rape.
February 25
 Amazon opens its first cashierless grocery store, located in Seattle.
 Bob Chapek is named CEO of The Walt Disney Company replacing Bob Iger.
February 26
COVID-19 pandemic: First case of community spread reported in California.
February 27
COVID-19 pandemic: Growing fear of the COVID-19 coronavirus pandemic causes the Dow Jones Industrial Average to plunge by 1,190.95 points (4.4%), closing at 25,766.64—its largest one-day points decline in history. This follows several days of large falls, the Dow's worst week since 2008.
Marine commandant General David H. Berger orders the removal of Confederate symbols from Marine Corps bases around the world.
Former Baltimore mayor Catherine Pugh is sentenced to three years in prison and three years probation after pleading guilty to tax evasion and conspiracy to defraud the government.
February 29
The Trump administration and the Taliban sign a conditional peace agreement in Doha, Qatar as part of a process to end the war in Afghanistan.
COVID-19 pandemic: The first death from COVID-19 in the U.S. is reported by officials in Washington state, as the total number of cases nationwide reaches 66.
The 2020 South Carolina Democratic presidential primary is held; billionaire candidate Tom Steyer suspends his presidential campaign.

March 
 March 1 – Former South Bend, Indiana mayor Pete Buttigieg suspends his presidential campaign.
 March 2
A tornado outbreak strikes four counties around Nashville, Tennessee, killing 26 people.
Senator Amy Klobuchar suspends her presidential campaign.
MSNBC commentator Chris Matthews announces his retirement.
 March 3 – Super Tuesday 2020 takes place.
 March 3–10 – The 2020 Democrats Abroad presidential primary takes place.
 March 4
COVID-19 pandemic: At least 130 cases of COVID-19 are reported in the United States, with ten deaths in Washington State and one in California. California governor Gavin Newsom declares a state of emergency.
Former New York City mayor Michael Bloomberg suspends his presidential campaign.
 March 5
COVID-19 pandemic: The Senate approves an $8.3 billion federal emergency aid package in response to the COVID-19 coronavirus pandemic. President Trump signs the bill into law the next day.
The Arizona House of Representatives passes a bill banning transgender females from sports.
Senator Elizabeth Warren suspends her presidential campaign.
March 6
COVID-19 pandemic:
Florida reports two deaths from COVID-19, the first confirmed U.S. fatalities outside of the west coast.
The annual South by Southwest (SXSW) festival is canceled due to COVID-19 fears; it is the first time the event has been canceled in its 34-year history.
March 7 – COVID-19 pandemic: Washington, D.C. records its first case of COVID-19.
 March 9
Black Monday 2020: Share prices fall sharply in response to economic concerns and the impact of COVID-19. The Dow Jones industrial average plunges more than 2,000 points, its biggest ever fall in intraday trading. Oil prices plunge by as much as 30% in early trading, the biggest fall since 1991, after Saudi Arabia launches a price war with Russia.
The U.S. begins a conditional troop withdrawal from Afghanistan; American troop numbers are to be reduced from 12,000 to 8,600 within 135 days.
 March 10 – COVID-19 pandemic: COVID-19 cases in the U.S. exceed 1,000, with a 50% increase within a 24-hour period and infections reported in 35 states.
 March 11
COVID-19 pandemic: 
President Trump announces a 30-day ban on incoming travel from Europe (with the exception of the United Kingdom), effective midnight EDT (0400 GMT) on March 13. The announcement occurs the same day the World Health Organization (WHO) declares the COVID-19 outbreak a pandemic. The travel ban is extended to the UK and Ireland on March 16.
The National Basketball Association suspends its season after Utah Jazz center Rudy Gobert test positive for the virus, becoming the first major professional sports league to do so.
Persian Gulf crisis: A British soldier and two Americans are killed in a rocket attack in Taji, Iraq.
The Justice Department and the Drug Enforcement Administration announce the arrest of more than 600 alleged members of the Jalisco New Generation Cartel.
Former film producer Harvey Weinstein is sentenced to 23 years in prison for rape and sexual assault.
March 12
COVID-19 pandemic: 
The Metropolitan Opera, Carnegie Hall, and the New York Philharmonic announce temporary shutdowns in response to the COVID-19 pandemic. New York Governor Andrew Cuomo subsequently announces restrictions on gatherings of 500 people or more, prompting all Broadway theatres to close.
The National Hockey League and Major League Soccer also suspend their seasons following the NBA suspension the night before. Major League Baseball suspends spring training. 
The NCAA cancels all Winter and Spring championships, including its men's and women's basketball tournaments, marking the first time both tournaments have been cancelled.
Black Thursday 2020: Following a series of recent major falls, the Dow Jones plunges yet again, this time by over 9.5%, along with markets around the world.
Federal judge Anthony Trenga orders whistleblower Chelsea Manning be released from prison, but must pay accrued fines of $256,000.

March 13
COVID-19 pandemic:
President Trump declares a national emergency in response to the COVID-19 pandemic, freeing up $50 billion in disaster relief funds.
The Food and Drug Administration (FDA) grants emergency authorization for a coronavirus test by Swiss diagnostics maker Roche.
Bill Gates steps down from the board of Microsoft to focus on philanthropic activities.
Breonna Taylor, a 26-year-old emergency medical technician, is shot eight times by Louisville police during a no-knock warrant as part of a narcotics investigation.
March 15 – COVID-19 pandemic: The Federal Reserve announces that it will cut its target interest rate to 0-0.25 percent.
March 16
COVID-19 pandemic: 
Most schools nationwide are closed by this date. 
The Dow Jones falls by −2,997.10, the single largest point drop in history and the second largest percentage drop ever at −12.93%, a larger crash than the Wall Street Crash of 1929.
The first Phase 1 clinical trial evaluating a potential COVID-19 vaccine begins at Kaiser Permanente Washington Health Research Institute in Seattle.
The 2020 Kentucky Derby is postponed until September 5, the first postponement since 1945.
March 17
COVID-19 pandemic: West Virginia becomes the 50th state to have a confirmed a case of COVID-19.
After 20 seasons, New England Patriots quarterback Tom Brady announces he will not re-sign with the team, instead selecting free agency.
March 18
COVID-19 pandemic:
President Trump signs the Families First Coronavirus Response Act into law and announces he will invoke the Defense Production Act to improve U.S. medical resources and that he directed the Housing and Urban Development Department (HUD) to suspend evictions and foreclosures of federal housing until the end of April. He also announces the temporary closure of the Canada–United States border; cross-border trade will continue.
The Dow Jones closes down 6 percent, falling below 20,000 points.
A 5.9 earthquake hits Salt Lake City, Utah.
Representative Tulsi Gabbard suspends her presidential campaign.
March 19 – COVID-19 pandemic: The Department of Labor reports that 281,000 Americans filed for unemployment in the last week, a 33 percent increase over the prior week and the biggest percentage increase since 1992.
March 20 – COVID-19 pandemic: The governor of New York orders staff at all "non-essential" businesses to remain at home as the number of COVID-19 cases in the state exceeds 7,000.
March 21 – COVID-19 pandemic: Biotech company Cepheid Inc reports that it has been granted FDA approval for a new rapid diagnostic test, able to detect COVID-19 in 45 minutes.
March 22
COVID-19 pandemic:
President Trump says the National Guard has been activated in California, Washington, and New York, thus far the most impacted states during the pandemic. The Washington National Guard clarifies that it was yet to be "activated", only put on stand-by.
The USNS Comfort (T-AH-20) hospital ship is announced to be deployed to New York. The USNS Mercy (T-AH-19) is to be deployed to Los Angeles.
Rand Paul (R-KY) is the first senator to test positive for COVID-19.
March 23 – Colorado becomes the 22nd state to abolish the death penalty.
March 24
COVID-19 pandemic: 
The Dow Jones jumps by over 2,100 points, or 11.3 percent—its biggest one-day percentage gain since 1933.
The U.S. box office records zero revenue for the first time ever.
Nevada governor Steve Sisolak bans the use of anti-malaria drugs for COVID-19 treatment, notably chloroquine and hydroxychloroquine.
FBI agents kill a man in Belton, Missouri suspected of plotting a bombing attack at a Kansas City hospital believed to be treating COVID-19 patients.
A Gallup poll places President Trump's approval rating at 49 percent, his highest thus far. A separate Hill-HarrisX poll places him at 50 percent, his highest since August 2018.
March 25
COVID-19 pandemic: 
Nationwide COVID-19 deaths surpass 1,000 as the total number of cases reach almost 69,000.
The White House and the Senate agree to a $2 trillion stimulus package—the largest in U.S. history—to boost the economy amid the ongoing pandemic. The Senate subsequently approves the negotiated bill (the CARES Act) in a 96–0 vote. Trump signs the bill into law on March 27 after a House voice vote.
The Pentagon orders a 60-day halt on all overseas troop travel and movement as 227 U.S. troops have thus far tested positive for COVID-19. The withdrawal from Afghanistan will continue.
March 26
COVID-19 pandemic: 
Nationwide COVID-19 infections exceed 82,000—surpassing infections in China and Italy—as the U.S. now has more cases reported than any other country to date.
The Department of Labor reports that 3.28 million Americans filed for unemployment benefits in the last week, the largest increase in U.S. history. It supersedes the all-time high of 695,000 in October 1982.
The Trump administration indicts Venezuelan president Nicolás Maduro's government of drug trafficking and narcoterrorism and offers a $15 million reward for information leading to Maduro's arrest.
The Space Force launches its first satellite, a $1.4 billion Advanced Extremely High Frequency (AEHF-6) military communications satellite.
March 27 – President Trump signs the CARES Act in response to the COVID-19 pandemic. 
March 29 – U.S.-led coalition troops withdraw from Iraq's K-1 Air Base, the third base transferred to the Iraqi military this month.
March 31
COVID-19 pandemic:
 Nationwide reported COVID-19 cases exceed 163,000 as the national death toll reaches 3,000. Three-quarters of the U.S. population are under lockdown as Maryland, Virginia, Arizona and Tennessee become the latest states to restrict movement.
U.S. dairy producers dump thousands of gallons of milk as farmers cannot get their product to market due to a truck driver shortage.
The Federal Communications Commission mandates cell phone providers implement STIR/SHAKEN by June 30, 2021 for large carriers and June 30, 2022 for small carriers to prevent robocalls maliciously using caller ID spoofing to avoid being traced.
A 6.5 earthquake strikes Central Idaho.

April
April 1
The Trump administration deploys anti-drug Navy ships and AWACS planes near Venezuela in reportedly the largest military build-up in the region since the 1989 invasion of Panama.
Coal companies owned by West Virginia Governor Jim Justice agree to pay $5 million for thousands of mine safety violations.
April 3 – COVID-19 pandemic: The CDC recommends all citizens consider wearing cloth or fabric face coverings in public.
April 6 
COVID-19 pandemic: Nationwide COVID-19 deaths surpass 10,000, with more than 19,800 recoveries.
President Trump signs an executive order encouraging future long-term commercial exploitation of various celestial bodies and mining of lunar resources.
April 7 – COVID-19 pandemic: The U.S. records the most COVID-19 deaths in a single day to date, with more than 1,800 fatalities reported, taking the cumulative total to nearly 13,000. This is overtaken on April 15 when 2,371 deaths are recorded in a single day, topping 30,800 fatalities.
April 8
Senator Bernie Sanders suspends his presidential campaign, leaving Joe Biden as the presumptive Democratic nominee.
COVID-19 pandemic:
Over 100 inmates at Monroe Correctional Complex in Monroe, Washington riot after six inmates test positive for COVID-19.
The Broadway League extends the Broadway theatre shutdown through June 7, projecting the longest shutdown in Broadway history.
April 11
COVID-19 pandemic: 
The U.S. becomes the country with the highest number of reported COVID-19 deaths: over 20,000, overtaking Italy.
For the first time in U.S. history, all 50 states have simultaneous federal major disaster declarations after Wyoming receives the final declaration. Washington, D.C., the U.S. Virgin Islands, the Northern Mariana Islands, Guam and Puerto Rico also have major disaster declarations by this time.
April 12 – At least 30 people are killed and 1.3 million left without electricity after an Easter tornado outbreak across the South.
April 14 – COVID-19 pandemic: President Trump announces that he will suspend U.S. funding of the World Health Organization (WHO) pending an investigation into its early response to the outbreak.
April 15
COVID-19 pandemic: 
Michigan Governor Gretchen Whitmer faces two federal lawsuits accusing her of violating constitutional rights during the state's containment efforts. Thousands of people attend a protest in Lansing as anti-lockdown sentiment spreads.
New York Governor Andrew Cuomo signs an executive order requiring everyone in the state to wear a mask or a mouth/nose covering in public when not social distancing.
April 16  
COVID-19 pandemic: 
It is revealed that nearly 22 million Americans have filed for unemployment within a single month due to COVID-19 lockdowns, the worst unemployment crisis since the Great Depression.
The Trump administration reveals federal guidelines outlining a three-phased, gradual reopening of schools, commerce, and services for parts of the country.
April 17 – COVID-19 pandemic: Texas is the first state to begin easing coronavirus-related restrictions. Florida's Duval County is the first in the state to ease restrictions, with Jacksonville, Atlantic, and Neptune being the first beaches in the state to reopen, on a limited basis.
April 20 – Oil prices reach a record low, falling into negative values, due to the ongoing COVID-19 pandemic and the Russia–Saudi Arabia oil price war.
April 21
COVID-19 pandemic: The state of Missouri challenges China's sovereign immunity in U.S. district court by suing three Chinese government ministries, two local governments, two laboratories and the Chinese Communist Party over its handling of the COVID-19 outbreak.
A bipartisan Senate report reaffirms intelligence findings that Russia meddled in the 2016 presidential election.
April 22 – COVID-19 pandemic: President Trump signs an immigration executive order halting the issuance of certain green cards for 60 days.
April 24
COVID-19 pandemic:
New Jersey reports 100,000 cases and 5,617 deaths.
President Trump signs a $483 billion bill to rescue small businesses.
April 27
COVID-19 pandemic: Nationwide confirmed COVID-19 cases surpass 1 million.
The Pentagon officially releases three short videos showing "unidentified aerial phenomena" that had previously been revealed by The New York Times in 2019.
April 29 – The Department of Commerce reports that the U.S. economy shrank by 4.8% in the first quarter of 2020, its most severe contraction since 2008.
April 30
COVID-19 pandemic: Armed protesters enter Michigan's State Capitol building to demand an end to lockdown measures.
NASA selects three U.S. companies—Blue Origin, Dynetics, and SpaceX—to design and develop human landing systems for the agency's Artemis program, one of which is planned to deliver the first woman and next man on the Moon by 2024.

May
May 1 – COVID-19 pandemic: The FDA authorizes emergency remdesivir use to treat the sickest COVID-19 patients.
May 2 – 2020 Kansas Democratic primary: Joe Biden wins in a mail-in primary with ranked choice voting.
May 3 – The United States faces an invasion of Asian giant hornets (Vespa mandarinia magnifica), threatening domestic bees.
May 7 – The Department of Justice drops charges against former National Security Advisor Michael Flynn in the Mueller investigation. On May 11, nearly 2,000 former Justice Department officials sign a letter calling for Attorney General William Barr to resign over what they describe as his improper intervention in the Flynn case. 
May 8 – COVID-19 pandemic: The national unemployment level reaches 14.7%, with more than 33 million jobless claims having been filed since mid-March.
May 12  – COVID-19 pandemic: The Broadway League extends its shutdown of Broadway theatres for a second time, projecting reopening on September 6.
May 13 – COVID-19 pandemic: President Donald Trump's former election campaign chairman, Paul Manafort, is released to home confinement due to fears of possible COVID-19 infection.
May 15
COVID-19 pandemic: The Trump administration formally announces Operation Warp Speed, a public–private partnership for accelerating the development of a COVID-19 vaccine.
The Senate Intelligence Committee submits the fifth and final volume of its report on Russian election meddling to the ODNI for classification review. The report totals "nearly 1,000 pages". It is released on August 18, reportedly providing new information about President Trump's relationship with Russian officials.
A 6.4 earthquake strikes Nevada.
May 16
Tropical Storm Arthur is the first storm of the 2020 Atlantic hurricane season.
An explosion in Little Tokyo, Los Angeles sets multiple buildings on fire and leaves 11 firefighters injured. 
A massive fire destroys a historic condominium in Padre Island, Texas.
May 18 – The FBI confirms that the 2019 Naval Air Station Pensacola shooting was the first terrorist attack on U.S. territory that had been directed by a foreign actor since 9/11.
May 19 
COVID-19 pandemic: The U.S. surpasses 1.5 million confirmed COVID-19 cases and 90,000 deaths.
 Two dams in Midland County, Michigan, fail, resulting in extensive evacuations and the declaration of a state of emergency.
The Congressional Budget Office reports a 38% fall in GDP on an annualized basis in the second quarter of 2020, with 26 million more unemployed Americans than in Q4 2019.
May 20 – COVID-19 pandemic: James Jamal Curry, 31, who spat and coughed on a police officer in Miami, Florida after claiming to have COVID-19, is indicted for committing a biological weapon hoax (terrorism).
May 25 – Minneapolis police officer Derek Chauvin murders George Floyd, 46, by kneeling on his neck, as three other officers watch. Video of the incident goes viral and the four officers are subsequently fired. 

May 26
George Floyd protests: Major protests begin in the Minneapolis–Saint Paul (Twin Cities) area following the murder of George Floyd.
For the first time, Twitter labels a tweet by President Trump "misleading" and includes a "fact check" link.
May 27
COVID-19 pandemic: The official nationwide death toll surpasses 100,000—more Americans than were killed in the Vietnam and Korean wars combined, and approaching that of the First World War, when more than 116,000 Americans died in combat.
George Floyd protests: Protests in Minneapolis turn violent as activists call for murder charges against the police officers involved in George Floyd's murder.
President Trump threatens to shut down Twitter and other social media platforms, accusing them of bias against conservatives.
May 28
George Floyd protests: A state of emergency is declared in the Twin Cities, with hundreds of National Guard soldiers deployed on the streets as protests spread nationwide.
President Trump signs an executive order rolling back liability protections for social media companies over user-generated content.
May 29
George Floyd protests:
Minneapolis officer Derek Chauvin is charged with third-degree murder and manslaughter in the killing of George Floyd. An independent autopsy concludes on June 1 that Floyd's cause of death was "homicide caused by asphyxia". Minnesota Attorney General Keith Ellison later increases the charge against Derek Chauvin to second degree on June 3; charges against the three other officers who were present are also filed.
Twitter hides a tweet by President Trump after he reacts to the Minneapolis unrest by warning that "when the looting starts, the shooting starts." Twitter says the post violates its rules on glorifying violence.
May 30
The first crewed flight of the SpaceX Dragon 2 (initially scheduled for May 27 but delayed due to weather) is launched from Cape Canaveral, Florida, the first crewed spacecraft to launch from U.S. soil since 2011.
George Floyd protests: Curfews are declared in Los Angeles, Philadelphia and Atlanta as riots and protests continue nationwide. The weeks' rioting is termed the worst instance of civil unrest in the United States since the 1968 King assassination riots.
May 31 – In response to the wave of civil unrest across the country, President Trump says he will designate the far-left activist group Antifa a terrorist organization. The next day, June 1, Trump threatens to deploy the military to quell the riots and conducts a controversial photo-op at St. John's Episcopal Church.

June
June 2 – Blackout Tuesday, an industry-driven collective protest against racism and police brutality inspired by the George Floyd protests, is observed.
June 3 – A 5.5 Mw earthquake said to be an aftershock of the 2019 Ridgecrest earthquakes hits near Searles Valley, California. No injuries or damages are reported.
June 5 – Washington, D.C. mayor Muriel Bowser designates a two-block-long section of 16th Street NW as "Black Lives Matter Plaza".
June 8
Amid unrest in Seattle, protestors declare an autonomous zone in the city's Capitol Hill.
Amid renewed national debate over Confederate monuments, Army Secretary Ryan D. McCarthy says he will consider renaming the service's 10 bases and facilities that are named after Confederate leaders, a reversal of the Army's previous position on the issue. A provision to rename the bases is later included in the 2021 National Defense Authorization Act.
June 9 – Air Force General Charles Brown becomes the first African American to lead a branch of U.S. Armed Forces and the first African American Air Force Chief of Staff. 
June 10 – COVID-19 pandemic: Nationwide confirmed COVID-19 cases surpass 2 million.
June 11 – The Trump administration authorizes sanctions and additional visa restrictions against the International Criminal Court in retaliation for their investigation into potential war crimes by U.S. officials.
June 12
The Minneapolis City Council votes unanimously to disband the Minneapolis Police Department and replace it with a "community" safety department, however it is prevented from doing so by the city charter.
Protests breakout in Atlanta following the killing of Rayshard Brooks, 27, by a police officer in the parking lot of a fast food restaurant. The next day, June 13, Atlanta Chief of Police Erika Shields resigns and protesters burn down the fast food restaurant where the incident took place.
June 14 – COVID-19 pandemic: New infections increase by 25,000, the highest since May 2, in part due to increased testing.
June 15
The Supreme Court rules that Title VII of the Civil Rights Act of 1964, which makes it illegal for employers to discriminate because of a person's sex, also covers sexual orientation.
COVID-19 pandemic: The FDA withdraws emergency use authorization for hydroxychloroquine to treat hospitalized COVID-19 patients, citing unnecessary risk.
June 18 – The Environmental Protection Agency (EPA) withdraws the introduction of federal limits for perchlorate, which has been linked to brain damage in infants.
June 19 – Juneteenth is observed across the country. 
June 20 – President Trump holds his first 2020 campaign rally in months at the Bank of Oklahoma Center in Tulsa, Oklahoma.
June 25 – COVID-19 pandemic: The U.S. reaches a record daily high of 40,000 new COVID-19 cases, following a reversal in the downward trend of infections in early June. Southern and western states are the worst affected.
June 26
President Trump signs an executive order against the destruction or vandalism of public monuments, memorials, or statues.
The New York Times reports that a Russian military intelligence unit offered bounties to Taliban-linked militants for the killing of U.S. soldiers in Afghanistan and that President Trump was briefed on the findings in late March 2020, but did not authorize any response. Trump denies he was ever briefed on the matter.
June 29 – COVID-19 pandemic: Arizona Governor Doug Ducey orders all bars, nightclubs, gyms, movie theaters and water parks to close for 30 days due to a spike in COVID-19 cases.
June 30 – Following a vote by the state legislature, Mississippi governor Tate Reeves signs a bill retiring the official Mississippi state flag, the last state flag incorporating the Confederate Battle Flag of the Army of Northern Virginia into its design. A commission is established to design a new state flag.

July
July 1 – The House Armed Services Committee votes for a National Defense Authorization Act amendment to restrict President Trump's ongoing troop withdrawal from Afghanistan and prospective withdrawal from Germany.
July 2
The FBI arrests British socialite Ghislaine Maxwell, an associate of late disgraced U.S. financier Jeffrey Epstein, in New Hampshire.
COVID-19 pandemic: Florida reports 10,000 new coronavirus cases in a single day, the biggest one-day increase in the state since the pandemic started, and more than any European country had at the height of their outbreaks.
July 4
Rapper Kanye West announces his candidacy in the 2020 presidential election.
The 2020 Salute to America Independence Day event is held in Washington, D.C.
July 7 – Primary elections are held in New Jersey, rescheduled from June 2.
July 8
The Supreme Court rules that President Trump must release his financial records for examination by prosecutors in New York.
COVID-19 pandemic: Florida emerges as the world's new epicenter of the pandemic, with 220,500 confirmed cases statewide.
Naya Rivera, a star in the show Glee, dies at age of 33 from drowning. Her death was not announced until July 13, 2020. 
July 10 – President Trump commutes the 40-month sentence of political consultant Roger Stone.
July 11 – COVID-19 pandemic: President Trump is seen publicly wearing a face mask for the first time while visiting wounded soldiers and health care workers at Walter Reed Military Hospital.
July 12  
18 sailors are injured by an explosion and fire on the USS Bonhomme Richard in San Diego, California.
COVID-19 pandemic: Florida reports 15,299 cases, a new single-day record since the start of the pandemic.
July 14
White supremacist and murderer Daniel Lewis Lee is executed by lethal injection in Terre Haute, Indiana, becoming the first federal execution since 2003.
COVID-19 pandemic: 
The Trump administration orders hospitals to bypass the CDC and send all COVID-19 patient data to a central database in Washington, D.C.
Pharmaceutical company Moderna announces that its vaccine will begin the final phase of testing, with approximately 30,000 human volunteers.
July 15
The Twitter accounts of prominent political figures, CEOs, and celebrities are hacked to promote a bitcoin scam.
COVID-19 pandemic: Georgia Governor Brian Kemp voids all of the state's local face mask mandates.
July 17 – Secretary of Defense Mark Esper issues a memorandum to the military on the appropriate display of flags, which excludes the Confederate flag, thereby effectively banning it.
July 18 – George Floyd protests: Oregon Attorney General Ellen Rosenblum files a lawsuit against the federal government, accusing it of unlawfully detaining protesters in Portland.
July 21 – Republican Ohio House Speaker Larry Householder is arrested by federal agents in connection with a $60 million bribery case. Former Ohio GOP Chairman Matt Borges is also arrested, along with a GOP advisor and two lobbyists.
July 22
A 7.8-magnitude earthquake is reported off the coast of Alaska.
George Floyd protests: President Trump announces a "surge" in deployments of federal officers to Democratic-run cities, following an earlier crackdown on protests in Oregon.
July 23 – The Trump administration announces that it is revoking the Affirmatively Furthering Fair Housing provision of the 1968 Fair Housing Act.
July 25 – Hurricane Hanna makes two landfalls in South Texas, one in Padre Island and another in Kenedy County, killing 5 people. 
July 29 – George Floyd protests: Oregon Governor Kate Brown and Vice President Mike Pence agree to a phased withdrawal of deployed federal law enforcement from Portland.
July 30
Federal economic figures show a 32.9% annualized rate of GDP contraction between April and June, the sharpest decline since records began in 1945.
President Trump suggests delaying the 2020 presidential election, saying increased voting by mail could lead to fraud and inaccurate results.

August
August 2 – Crew Dragon Demo-2, the first U.S.-crewed splashdown since 1975, lands in the Gulf of Mexico.
August 3
Hurricane Isaias makes landfall in North Carolina.
7,500 east Los Angeles residents are evacuated in the Apple Fire.
August 4 – The Great American Outdoors Act is passed.
 August 5 – Secretary of Health and Human Services Alex Azar travels to Taiwan, the highest U.S. official visit to the country in 40 years.
August 6
New York Attorney General Letitia James announces a lawsuit aimed at dissolving the National Rifle Association over alleged financial mismanagement.
President Trump signs an executive order banning any U.S. companies or citizens from making transactions with ByteDance, the parent company of TikTok, in 45 days. He takes similar action against Tencent.
Facebook founder Mark Zuckerberg reaches a net worth exceeding $100 billion, becoming the third centibillionaire, alongside Jeff Bezos and Bill Gates.
August 7–17 – COVID-19 pandemic: The Sturgis Motorcycle Rally takes place despite concerns by health officials.
August 9 – President Trump is escorted from a news briefing by the Secret Service following a shooting near the White House.
August 10–11 – A derecho with winds recorded at up to 140 mph strikes the Midwest, resulting in four deaths, hundreds of injuries, widespread utility outages, and severe property damage. 
August 11 – Democratic presidential candidate Joe Biden names Senator Kamala Harris as his vice presidential nominee, the first African American woman to serve in the role.
August 13
The 2020 Postal Service crisis begins after plans are revealed to remove hundreds of high-volume mail sorting machines from postal facilities across the country.
The Pentagon reportedly begins establishing a new task force to investigate UFO sightings, particularly over military bases, similar to the U.S. Navy's Unidentified Aerial Phenomena Task Force.
August 16 – During a record-breaking heat wave, a remnant thunderstorm from Tropical Storm Fausto spawns hundreds of wildfires in California.
August 17–20 – The Democratic National Convention is held in Milwaukee, Wisconsin, with events happening virtually. Delegates of the Democratic Party formally choose former Vice President Joe Biden and Senator Kamala Harris of California as the party's nominees for president and vice president, respectively, in the 2020 election.
August 19 – Apple Inc. becomes the first U.S. company to be valued at over $2 trillion.
August 20
COVID-19 pandemic: Bill Cassidy (R-LA) is the second senator to test positive for COVID-19. 
Former White House advisor Steve Bannon is arrested and charged with fraud over a fundraising campaign to build a wall on the U.S.-Mexico border. He is released on a $5 million bail bond after pleading not guilty.
August 23
Violent protests break out in Kenosha, Wisconsin following the shooting of Jacob Blake, 29, by a police officer.
COVID-19 pandemic: The FDA grants emergency use authorization to antibody-rich blood plasma for the treatment of COVID-19 in hospitalized patients.
 August 24–27 – The Republican National Convention is held in Charlotte, North Carolina and Washington, D.C. Delegates of the Republican Party formally nominate incumbent President Donald Trump and Vice President Mike Pence as the party's nominees for the 2020 election.
August 25 – Four U.S. soldiers are diagnosed with mild concussion-like symptoms following a skirmish with Russian forces in northeast Syria. 
August 26–31: Riots break out in downtown Minneapolis following false rumors about the suicide of an African American man being pursued by police. 113 people are arrested.
August 26
Kenosha protests:
Two people are fatally shot overnight during unrest in Kenosha, Wisconsin; a suspect is arrested. 
Professional athletes begin boycotting their respective sports contests in response to the shooting of Jacob Blake.
Hurricane Laura, heading towards the Louisiana-Texas border, intensifies to a Category 4 storm.
Amazon CEO Jeff Bezos becomes the first person in history to have a net worth exceeding $200 billion, according to Forbes.
August 28 – Thousands of people gather at the Lincoln Memorial in Washington, D.C. for the Commitment March in support of black civil rights.
 Black Panther actor Chadwick Boseman dies at the age of 43, after privately battling with colon cancer for 4 years.

September
September 2 – Protests breakout in Rochester, New York following the release of police body camera footage of the fatal March 2020 arrest of Daniel Prude.
September 4 – A Trump administration memo calls on all executive branch agencies to cease funding for diversity and sensitivity training and teachings of critical race theory.
September 5 – Authentic wins the 2020 Kentucky Derby.
September 6 – California sets a new record for land area destroyed by wildfires, with 2.1 million acres burned in the year thus far.
September 9 – President Donald Trump is nominated for the 2021 Nobel Peace Prize by a Norwegian lawmaker for his role in facilitating the Israel–United Arab Emirates normalization agreement.
September 10 – Over 10 percent of Oregon's state population are reported to be fleeing wildfires.
September 12 – Two Los Angeles County Sheriff's Department deputies are shot and critically injured while sitting in their patrol car in Compton, California.
September 16 – Hurricane Sally brings massive flooding to the South after making landfall, killing eight people and costing billions in damage.
September 17 – President Trump announces the formation of the 1776 Commission.
September 18 – A Supreme Court seat is vacated following the death of Justice Ruth Bader Ginsburg, 87. President Trump says he will choose a woman to fill the seat.
September 19
At least 16 people are shot and two confirmed dead in a mass shooting at a backyard party in Rochester, New York.
Law enforcement officials report the interception of a package, addressed to President Trump, containing the lethal toxin ricin.
September 21 – Microsoft agrees to buy ZeniMax Media holding company and its subsidiaries for $7.5 billion, the largest and most expensive takeover in the history of the video game industry.
September 22 – COVID-19 pandemic: Nationwide official COVID-19 deaths surpass 200,000.
September 25 – President Trump unveils his "Platinum Plan" at a campaign rally in Atlanta, in which he proposes making Juneteenth a federal holiday, labeling the Ku Klux Klan and Antifa as terrorist organizations, and making lynching a national hate crime, among other socioeconomic initiatives aimed at African Americans.
September 26 – President Trump nominates Seventh Circuit Court of Appeals Judge Amy Coney Barrett to fill the vacant Supreme Court seat following the death of Justice Ruth Bader Ginsburg.
September 27
A New York Times report on President Trump's personal and business tax returns alleges years of tax avoidance and millions in debt and IRS penalties, among other allegations.
Former Trump campaign manager Brad Parscale is hospitalized under the Florida Mental Health Act after arming himself and threatening to commit suicide at his home.
September 28 – The Tampa Bay Lightning defeat the Dallas Stars 4–2 to win their second Stanley Cup championship.  
September 29 – The first 2020 presidential debate between President Donald Trump and former Vice President Joe Biden takes place in Cleveland, Ohio.

October
October 1 
COVID-19 pandemic: The White House COVID-19 outbreak is realized, as both President Donald Trump and First Lady Melania Trump test positive for COVID-19 and enter quarantine. Several White House staffers and multiple congress members also test positive.
The Trump administration announces plans to slash U.S. refugee admissions for 2021 to a record low–15,000 refugees, down from a cap of 18,000 for 2020.
October 3 – COVID-19 pandemic: By this date, multiple U.S. senators whom have attended presidential events have tested positive for COVID-19.
October 5 – COVID-19 pandemic: President Trump returns to the White House after three days of hospitalization at Walter Reed National Military Medical Center.
October 7
Ruby Tuesday files for Chapter 11 bankruptcy protection after closing 185 restaurants. Pizza Hut files for Chapter 11 bankruptcy after closing 163 restaurants.
The 2020 Vice Presidential debate takes place in Salt Lake City.
October 8
COVID-19 pandemic: 34 editors of The New England Journal of Medicine denounce the Trump administration's handling of the pandemic.
A former leading fundraiser for president Donald Trump has been indicted on a charge that he illegally lobbied the US government to drop its probe into the Malaysia 1MDB corruption scandal and to deport an exiled Chinese billionaire. The indictment said Elliott Broidy was recruited in 2017 by an unnamed foreign national, understood to be Malaysian Low Taek Jho, to pressure US officials to end their investigation into a scandal engulfing the then Malaysian prime minister, Najib Razak.
The FBI charges 13 militiamen with plotting to kidnap Michigan Governor Gretchen Whitmer at her vacation home. A fourteenth suspect is arrested on October 15.
October 9 
House Democrats announce plans to create a congressional commission invoking the 25th Amendment to evaluate the physical and mental health of the president.
Hurricane Delta makes landfall near Creole, Louisiana, the tenth landfalling storm in the 2020 season, a record breaking amount.
COVID-19 pandemic: The Broadway League extends its shutdown of Broadway theaters for a third time, this time until May 30, 2021. 
October 10 – COVID-19 pandemic: President Trump hosts his first public event at the White House since becoming ill, informing attendees that a vaccine is forthcoming.
October 11 – The Los Angeles Lakers defeat the Miami Heat in the 2020 NBA Finals to win their 17th championship in franchise history.
October 12
Facebook bans content relating to Holocaust denial.
Activists in Portland, Oregon, topple statues of former presidents Theodore Roosevelt and Abraham Lincoln in protest of the 1862 execution of 38 Dakota and Roosevelt's views on Native Americans.
October 15 
President Trump and Joe Biden participate in dueling town halls. Biden's is hosted by ABC's George Stephanopoulos and Trump's is hosted by NBC's Savannah Guthrie.
North Carolina confirms the state's first influenza death of the 2020–2021 flu season.
October 16 – COVID-19 pandemic: The U.S. surpasses eight million COVID-19 cases.
October 22
The Senate Judiciary Committee unanimously votes for the nomination of Judge Amy Coney Barrett, 12–0, as committee Democrats boycott the roll call.
The second 2020 presidential debate takes place in Nashville, Tennessee.
October 23 – COVID-19 pandemic:  Arkansas and Oregon set single-day records for new cases.
October 24 – COVID-19 pandemic: Michigan, Illinois, New Mexico, and Ohio all set single-day records for new cases.
October 25 – Daily nonstop American Airlines flights return to India for the first time since 2015.
October 26
The Senate confirms Amy Coney Barrett as Supreme Court justice, 52–48, as Senate Democrats failed to stop the process.
The Supreme Court rules 5-3 that Wisconsin cannot count mail-in ballots received after election day.
Walter Wallace Jr., 27, is shot and killed by two Philadelphia police officers, resulting in subsequent protests and riots.
October 27
COVID-19 pandemic: Pennsylvania, Wisconsin, and Kentucky reach new one-day records for new cases.
The Los Angeles Dodgers defeat the Tampa Bay Rays to win the 2020 World Series, their first in 32 years.
October 28 – President Trump declares a state of emergency for Louisiana ahead of Hurricane Zeta's landfall.
October 29 
COVID-19 pandemic: 
Michigan, Oregon, and Illinois report new single-day records for new cases. 
87,164 new cases are reported nationally, a new single-day record.
October 30
COVID-19 pandemic: 
The U.S. is the first country to exceed 100,000 daily cases of COVID-19.
Nationwide COVID-19 cases surpass nine million.
The FBI launches an investigation into an incident in Texas where a Joe Biden campaign bus tour was cancelled after a caravan of supporters of President Trump attempted to run it off the road and hit a staffer's car.
October 31
COVID-19 pandemic: 
New York Governor Andrew Cuomo announces all out-of-state visitors must test negative for COVID-19 three days before arrival.
A Stanford University study links over 30,000 COVID-19 cases and 700 deaths directly to President Donald Trump's 2020 campaign rallies.

November

November 3
2020 United States elections:
The 2020 United States presidential election takes place. Shortly after midnight, President Trump asserts that he has won the election and demands all vote counting to stop, alleging potential electoral fraud.
Oregon becomes the first state to decriminalize possession of small amounts of narcotics, including heroin, cocaine and LSD.
Voters in Arizona, Montana, New Jersey, and South Dakota vote to legalize recreational marijuana. Voters in Mississippi and South Dakota vote to legalize medical marijuana.
Mississippi approves a new state flag to replace the previous design that featured a Confederate battle flag, while voters in Rhode Island approve the removal of "...and Providence Plantations" from the state's official name.
November 4 – The United States formally withdraws from the Paris Agreement.
November 5
Former White House advisor Steve Bannon is permanently banned from Twitter after suggesting FBI Director Christopher Wray and NIAID Director Dr. Anthony Fauci be beheaded during a live broadcast.
 2020 presidential election: Amid election-related protests, Facebook bans a 300,000-member Stop the Steal group page being used by supporters of President Trump to organize protests against the election results, citing calls for violence by some participants.
November 6 
COVID-19 pandemic:
Texas surpasses one million confirmed cases of COVID-19, the first state and the world's first place to pass that milestone that is not an independent country.
Michigan surpasses 200,000 confirmed cases of COVID-19. 
November 7
2020 presidential election:
Joe Biden is projected to have won the presidential election, following several days of uncertainty due to postal vote counting. He is to be inaugurated on January 20, 2021. It is the first time since 1992 that an incumbent president's challenger has won the election over the incumbent president, when Bill Clinton defeated George H. W. Bush.
Kamala Harris is the first woman and first person of color to be elected Vice President of the United States. Her husband, Doug Emhoff, is to become the first Second Gentleman and the first Jewish spouse of a U.S. vice president.
November 8: Longtime Jeopardy host Alex Trebek dies at the age of 80 following a yearlong battle with pancreatic cancer.
November 9
2020 presidential election: President Trump's re-election campaign files multiple lawsuits in several states alleging widespread electoral fraud.
COVID-19 pandemic: Housing and Urban Development Secretary Dr. Ben Carson tests positive for COVID-19.
November 10 – President Trump promotes a number of reported loyalists to various roles in the Defense Department following the November 9 ouster of Defense Secretary Mark Esper.
November 12  
2020 presidential election: A coalition of federal and state officials declare the 2020 presidential election "the most secure in American history" and asserts there is no evidence of compromised voting systems.
COVID-19 pandemic:
California becomes the second state after Texas to reach one million cases.
More than 150,000 new cases are reported nationwide, setting a world record for a third consecutive day.
The FBI arrests convicted murderer Leonard Rayne Moses, who escaped from custody in 1971 and had been on their Ten Most Wanted Fugitives list.
November 13 
2020 presidential election: President-elect Joe Biden is projected to win Arizona, the first Democrat to do so since Bill Clinton in 1996. Biden also becomes the first Democrat to win Georgia since Clinton did so in 1992. 
COVID-19 pandemic:
More than 130 Secret Service agents are ordered to self-isolate or quarantine.
Nevada Governor Steve Sisolak tests positive for COVID-19.
Michigan, Wisconsin, Maryland, and Illinois report new single-day records for new cases. Illinois breaks the national record for new cases reported by a state in a single day.
Oregon and North Dakota issue new mask mandates and restrictions on businesses.
A 5.5 Mw earthquake strikes Tonopah, Nevada, the largest earthquake in Nevada in over 66 years.
November 14 – 2020 presidential election: Thousands of protesters march in Washington, D.C. in support of President Trump and his claims of electoral voter fraud.
November 15 
2020 presidential election: President Trump concedes that Joe Biden won the presidential election, but alleges vote rigging.
COVID-19 pandemic: Kentucky and New Jersey report new single-day records for new cases.
November 16
SpaceX Crew-1, the first operational SpaceX crew dragon mission, launches from the Kennedy Space Center.
COVID-19 pandemic:
Texas surpasses 20,000 confirmed deaths from COVID-19, becoming the state with the second highest number of reported deaths in the country, behind New York.
Representatives Cheri Bustos (D-Illinois) and Tim Walberg (R-Michigan) announce they have tested positive for COVID-19. Representative Mark Pocan (D-Wisconsin) says he is self-isolating.
November 17
COVID-19 pandemic:
Wisconsin reports a record 92 new fatalities within the previous 24 hours, bringing the death toll to 2,741. A record 318 hospitalizations are also reported.
Maine, Idaho, and New Mexico report new single-day records for new cases.
Pennsylvania announces that out-of-state travelers will be required to either quarantine or present a negative COVID-19 test result to enter the state.
Ohio Governor Mike DeWine orders a three-week night time curfew from 10:00 pm until 5:00 am EST beginning November 19.
U.S. Senator Chuck Grassley (R-Iowa) tests positive for COVID-19.
The FDA grants emergency use authorization to a home testing kit by Lucira Health, Inc. that provides COVID-19 results in 30 minutes.
November 18
COVID-19 pandemic:
Nationwide COVID-19 deaths surpass 250,000.
The U.S. military reports a record high of 1,314 new COVID-19 cases.
New York City Mayor Bill de Blasio orders public schools to conduct classes exclusively online.
Minnesota Governor Tim Walz imposes several new four-week restrictions on businesses and indoor gatherings beginning November 20.
The Federal Aviation Administration allows the Boeing 737 MAX to fly in the United States citing modifications following a 20-month ban.
November 19
By this date, one-third of the Cincinnati City Council has been arrested this year on bribery charges.
2020 presidential election: Joe Biden's win in Georgia is upheld and reaffirmed following a hand recount, making him the first Democrat to win the state since Bill Clinton in 1992.
COVID-19 pandemic:
Utah reports a record number of new COVID-19 daily cases and deaths.
Pennsylvania and Maryland report new daily records for new cases.
California Governor Gavin Newsom orders a 10:00 p.m. to 5:00 a.m. PST curfew for 41 counties beginning November 21, affecting more than 90 percent of the state population.
November 20
At least eight people are injured in a mass shooting at the Mayfair Mall in Wauwatosa, Wisconsin.
COVID-19 pandemic:
Michigan, Ohio, California, and Utah report new single-day records for new cases. 
Donald Trump Jr. and U.S. Senator Rick Scott (R-Florida) test positive for COVID-19.
November 21
COVID-19 pandemic:
Nationwide COVID-19 cases surpass 12 million, six days after surpassing 11 million cases. More than 200,000 new cases have been reported in recent days. 
Michigan and New Jersey both surpass 300,000 confirmed cases of COVID-19. New Jersey, Mississippi, Oregon, and California report a record number of new daily cases.
U.S. Senator Kelly Loeffler (R-Georgia) enters quarantine after testing positive for COVID-19.
The FDA grants emergency use authorization for Regeneron Pharmaceuticals' antibody cocktail to treat COVID-19 patients.
November 22 – The United States withdraws from the Open Skies Treaty.
November 23  
2020 presidential election:
The presidential transition of President-elect Joe Biden formally begins.
Joe Biden nominates several people to his cabinet, including Avril Haines as the first female Director of National Intelligence, Alejandro Mayorkas as the first Latino Secretary of Homeland Security, and Janet Yellen as the first female Treasury Secretary.
November 24
Elon Musk overtakes Bill Gates to become the second richest person in the world, with a net worth of $127.9 billion, behind only Jeff Bezos.
The Dow Jones increases by 500 points to surpass 30,000 for the first time.
November 25
President Trump pardons ex-National Security Adviser Michael Flynn.
COVID-19 pandemic:
Texas reports a new daily record for new cases.
Wyoming Governor Mark Gordon tests positive for COVID-19.
November 27 
2020 presidential election: A recount in Wisconsin's largest county results in Joe Biden achieving a net gain of 132 votes.
COVID-19 pandemic: 
Nationwide COVID-19 cases surpass 13 million cases, six days after surpassing 12 million cases, the fourth million-milestone of the month.
Minnesota reports a new daily record for new deaths.
New York reports its highest daily new case total since April 24.
November 28 
Wilton Daniel Gregory becomes the first African American cardinal.
COVID-19 pandemic:
Michigan surpasses 9,000 confirmed deaths from COVID-19.
Ohio surpasses 400,000 COVID-19 cases.
Colorado Governor Jared Polis and his husband Marlon Reis test positive for COVID-19.
Mike Tyson returns to boxing in an exhibition bout against Roy Jones Jr. Youtuber Jake Paul knocks out NBA player Nate Robinson on the undercard.
November 29
President-elect Biden nominates an all-female communications team, including Kate Bedingfield as Communications Director and Jen Psaki as Press Secretary.
Charles Manson follower Leslie Van Houten's parole request is rejected by the state of California.
November 30 – Arizona Proposition 207 comes into effect, making Arizona the 12th state to legalize recreational cannabis.

December 
December 1
COVID-19 pandemic:
Congress unveils a $908 billion COVID-19 relief plan.
Oregon reports a new single day record for new deaths.
Florida exceeds one million COVID-19 cases, the third state to do so after Texas and California.
The Pennsylvania Supreme Court allows Bill Cosby to appeal a 2018 sexual assault conviction.
December 2 
Former astronaut Mark Kelly is sworn in as a U.S. Senator after a special election in Arizona.
COVID-19 pandemic:
New nationwide COVID-19 cases surpass 200,000 as the number of hospitalized COVID-19 patients surpasses 100,000.
Massachusetts reports record new daily cases and Illinois reports a record number of new deaths.
New Mexico surpasses 100,000 COVID-19 cases.
December 3
COVID-19 pandemic:
Total nationwide COVID-19 cases surpass 14 million and total deaths surpass 274,000.
President-elect Joe Biden announces that Dr. Vivek Murthy and Jeffrey Zients will lead his administration's response to the COVID-19 pandemic and asks Dr. Anthony Fauci to become the White House Coronavirus Task Force's chief medical advisor.
The Department of Justice files a lawsuit against Facebook, accusing them of discriminating against American workers.
The circuit court of Kenosha, Wisconsin orders 17-year old suspect Kyle Rittenhouse in the fatal Kenosha protest shooting to stand trial on two first-degree homicide charges, as well as possession of a firearm by a minor and two counts of reckless endangerment.
December 4
COVID-19 pandemic: Nationwide new daily cases surpass 227,885, breaking a record set the previous day.
The House of Representatives passes the MORE Act to decriminalize recreational cannabis at the federal level.
December 6
COVID-19 pandemic:
President Donald Trump says his personal lawyer and former New York City mayor Rudy Giuliani has tested positive for COVID-19. 
The Arizona House and Senate closes for a week due to COVID-19 concerns.
President-elect Biden nominates California Attorney General Xavier Becerra to be the first Latino Health and Human Services Secretary.
The Cleveland Browns defeat the Tennessee Titans 41–35 to secure their first winning season since 2007.
December 7
2020 presidential election: Georgia re-certifies Joe Biden as the winner of the state following a second recount.
Joe Biden nominates retired Army General Lloyd Austin to be the first African American Secretary of Defense.
The National Football League announces an investigation into the Washington Football Team for allegations of workplace sexual harassment.
COVID-19 pandemic:
Michigan extends its statewide partial shutdown on businesses, indoor dining in restaurants, and in-person instruction at high schools and colleges through December 20 after surpassing 400,000 confirmed COVID-19 cases. The same day the Michigan House of Representatives announce that they will cancel a voting session scheduled for December 8 (and later 9 and 10) after a legislative aide tested positive for COVID-19. 
Wyoming issues new containment procedures, including a statewide mask mandate for indoor public spaces lasting from December 9 to January 8. 
December 8
COVID-19 pandemic:
Nationwide COVID-19 cases surpass 15 million, with about one out of every 22 Americans having tested positive since the pandemic began.
Michigan surpasses 10,000 confirmed deaths from COVID-19. Governor Gretchen Whitmer orders flags to fly at half staff for the next 10 days, one day for every 1,000 victims.
December 9
Vice President Mike Pence announces the 18 Artemis astronauts at the eighth meeting of the National Space Council.
COVID-19 pandemic:
The U.S. surpasses 3,000 nationwide COVID-19 deaths in a single day for the first time.
Pennsylvania Governor Tom Wolf tests positive for COVID-19.
Nearly 30 members and staffers of the Michigan House of Representatives test positive for COVID-19.
Alabama Governor Kay Ivey announces that the statewide mask mandate and stay-at-home order will be extended until January 22.
December 11  
2020 presidential election: The Supreme Court denies a lawsuit to overturn Joe Biden's victory in four battleground states.
COVID-19 pandemic:
Nationwide COVID-19 cases surpass 16 million and a new one-day record of 3,309 deaths are reported.
California reports 35,468 new cases in the previous 24 hours, a new single-day record, and reports a record number of 2,013 hospitalized patients and 2,669 intensive care patients.
The FDA grants emergency authorization of the Pfizer–BioNTech COVID-19 vaccine. The vaccine begins shipment to all 50 states on December 13, with the first doses administered on December 14.
December 12 
COVID-19 pandemic: Florida surpasses 20,000 deaths from COVID-19, including residents and non-residents.
Four people are stabbed, one is shot, and 33 are arrested during pro-Donald Trump protests in Washington, D.C.
December 14
COVID-19 pandemic:
Nationwide COVID-19 deaths exceed 300,000.
West Virginia Governor Jim Justice is the first high-ranking elected official to receive the Pfizer–BioNTech COVID-19 vaccine.
Early voting in the upcoming Georgia runoff elections begin.
U.S. Representative Paul Mitchell (R-Michigan) announces he is leaving the Republican Party and becoming an independent.
December 15 – President-elect Joe Biden nominates Pete Buttigieg to be Secretary of Transportation, becoming the first openly gay person appointed to a cabinet-level position if confirmed.
December 16
COVID-19 pandemic:
Secretary of the Interior David Bernhardt and U.S. Representative Joe Wilson (R-South Carolina) test positive for COVID-19. Secretary of State Mike Pompeo enters quarantine.
Tennessee and California report daily records for new cases. California also reports a new daily record for deaths.
Michigan surpasses 11,000 deaths from COVID-19, eight days after surpassing 10,000.
December 17
Joe Biden nominates Deb Haaland for Secretary of the Interior, becoming the first Native American appointed to a cabinet-level position if confirmed.
COVID-19 pandemic:
California  reports new single-day records for new cases and new deaths, also breaking national records.
Texas reports a daily record for new cases.
December 18
Roy Charles Waller, also known as the NorCal Rapist, is sentenced to 897 years in prison for a series of rapes that spanned from 1991 to 2006.
COVID-19 pandemic:
The FDA authorizes emergency use of the Moderna COVID-19 vaccine.
Vice President Mike Pence, Second Lady Karen Pence, Surgeon General Jerome Adams, House Speaker Nancy Pelosi, and Senate Majority Leader Mitch McConnell receive the Pfizer–BioNTech COVID-19 vaccine.
Minnesota State Senator Jerry Relph dies of COVID-19 complications.
December 21
COVID-19 pandemic: 
Congress passes the Consolidated Appropriations Act, 2021, a packaged $2.3 trillion pandemic relief and omnibus spending bill. At 5,593 pages, it is the longest bill ever passed by Congress. After initial objections, President Trump signs the bill into law on December 27, averting a partial government shutdown.
President-elect Joe Biden and incoming First Lady Jill Biden receive the Pfizer–BioNTech COVID-19 vaccine.
December 22
President Trump begins issuing a new round of pardons for dozens of associates, including Roger Stone, Paul Manafort, and Charles Kushner.
California Secretary of State Alex Padilla is appointed to fill the remaining Senate term of Kamala Harris, becoming the state's first Latino senator.
 The local council of Murdock, Minnesota gives permit approving for a whites-only church. The Asatru Folk Assembly describes itself as a “warrior” religion of “white people” from northern Europe.
December 24
COVID-19 pandemic:
California is the first state to surpass two million COVID-19 cases.
Arkansas reports a new one-day record for new cases. 
December 25 – A suicide car bomb explosion in downtown Nashville, Tennessee leaves multiple people injured.
December 27 – COVID-19 pandemic: Nationwide COVID-19 cases surpass 19 million, having averaged 185,000 daily cases over the previous week.
December 29 
COVID-19 pandemic:
Vice President-elect Kamala Harris and her husband Doug Emhoff receive the Moderna vaccine.
California reports a new record number of daily deaths.
A statue of Abraham Lincoln in Boston that featured a slave kneeling before the former president is removed.
The Department of Justice announces there will be no charges against the two Cleveland, Ohio police officers accused of killing Tamir Rice.
December 31 
COVID-19 pandemic: 
Georgia Senate runoff candidate David Perdue and his wife enter quarantine despite negative test results.
A Wisconsin pharmacist is arrested after destroying 500 doses of the Moderna vaccine.

Deaths

January

 January 1
 Lexii Alijai, rapper (b. 1998)
 Tommy Hancock, Western swing fiddler and bandleader (b. 1929)
 Doug Hart, football player (b. 1939)
 Don Larsen, baseball player (b. 1929)
 Roland Minson, basketball player (b. 1929)
 David Stern, National Basketball Association commissioner (b. 1942)
 January 2 
 John Baldessari, conceptual artist (b. 1931)
 Tom Buck, politician and lawyer (b. 1938)
 Lorraine Chandler, soul singer and songwriter (b. 1946)
 R. Kern Eutsler, United Methodist bishop (b. 1919)
 Nick Fish, politician and lawyer (b. 1958)
 Sam Wyche, football player and coach (b. 1945)
 January 3 
 Ken Fuson, journalist (b. 1956)
 Reuben Hersh, mathematician (b. 1927)
 January 4 
 Emanuel Borok, violinist and concertmaster (b. 1944)
 James Parks Morton, Episcopal priest (b. 1930)
 January 5 – Betty Pat Gatliff, forensic artist (b. 1930)
 January 6 
 Mike Fitzpatrick, politician (b. 1963)
 Frank Gordon Jr., judge (b. 1929)
 January 7 
 Silvio Horta, screenwriter and television producer (b. 1974)
 Neil Peart, Canadian-American drummer and lyricist (b. 1952)
 George Perles, football coach (b. 1934)
 Patrick Welch, politician (b. 1948)
 Elizabeth Wurtzel, writer and journalist (b. 1967)
 January 8 
 Edd Byrnes, actor (b. 1932)
 Buck Henry, actor, screenwriter, and film director (b. 1930)
 January 9 
 Walter J. Boyne, U.S. Air Force officer and historian (b. 1929)
 Galen Cole, businessman and philanthropist (b. 1925)
 Pete Dye, golf course designer (b. 1925)
 Pampero Firpo, professional wrestler (b. 1930)
 Mike Resnick, science fiction writer (b. 1942)
 Hal Smith, baseball player (b. 1930)
 January 10 – Ed Sprague Sr., baseball pitcher (b. 1945)
 January 11 
 Stan Kirsch, actor, screenwriter, and film director (b. 1968)
 Steve Stiles, cartoonist and writer (b. 1943)
 January 12
 Jack Baskin, engineer, businessman, and philanthropist (b. 1919)
 C. Robert Sarcone, politician (b. 1925)
 January 14 – Steve Martin Caro, pop vocalist (b. 1948)
 January 15 – Rocky Johnson, Canadian professional wrestler (b. 1944)
 January 19 – Jimmy Heath, jazz saxophonist (b. 1926)
 January 23 – Jim Lehrer, journalist, novelist and screenwriter (b. 1934)
 January 24 – Pete Stark, businessman and politician (b. 1931)
 January 26 
 Kobe Bryant, basketball player (b. 1978)
 Louis Nirenberg, Canadian-American mathematician (b. 1925)
 January 28 – Chris Doleman, American Hall of Fame football player (b. 1961)
 January 31 – Mary Higgins Clark, author (b. 1927)

February

 February 3
 Gene Reynolds, actor, television writer, director, and producer (b. 1923)
 George Steiner, French-American literary critic and essayist (b. 1929)
 Willie Wood, American Hall of Fame professional football player (b. 1936)
 February 5 
 Stanley Cohen, biochemist (b. 1922)
 Kirk Douglas, actor, director, producer (b. 1916)
 February 7 – Orson Bean, actor and comedian (b. 1928)
 February 8 – Robert Conrad, actor (b. 1935)
 February 9 – Paula Kelly, dancer, singer, and actress (b. 1943)
 February 10 – Lyle Mays, jazz pianist and composer (b. 1953)
 February 14 – Lynn Cohen, actress (b. 1933)
 February 16 – Larry Tesler, computer scientist (b. 1945)
 February 17
 Ja'Net DuBois, actress (b. 1945)
Mickey Wright, American Hall of Fame professional golfer (b. 1935)
 February 19 – Pop Smoke, rapper (b. 1998)
 February 24 
 Diana Serra Cary, child actress (b. 1918)
 Clive Cussler, author (b. 1931)
 Katherine Johnson, mathematician (b. 1918)
 February 27
 R. D. Call, actor (b. 1950)
 Colin S. Gray, British-American writer (b. 1943)
 February 28 – Freeman Dyson, British-born American physicist and mathematician (b. 1923)
 February 29 – Bill Bunten, politician (b. 1930)

March 

 March 1 – Jack Welch, businessman, engineer and writer (b. 1935)
 March 2 – James Lipton, television host (b. 1926)
 March 6 – McCoy Tyner, jazz pianist (b. 1938)
 March 11 – Charles Wuorinen, American composer (b. 1938)
 March 16 – Stuart Whitman, American actor (b. 1928)
 March 17
 Roger Mayweather, American professional boxer and trainer (b. 1961)
 Lyle Waggoner, American actor (b. 1935)
 Alfred Worden, American astronaut (b. 1932)
 March 20 – Kenny Rogers, country singer and songwriter (b. 1938)
 March 24  
 Stuart Gordon, American film director (b. 1947)
 Terrence McNally, American playwright (b. 1938)
 March 26 – Curly Neal, American basketball player with the Harlem Globetrotters (b. 1942)
 March 27 – Joseph Lowery, minister and civil rights activist (b. 1921)
 March 28 – Tom Coburn, politician and physician (b. 1948)
 March 29 
 Philip W. Anderson, American physicist (b. 1923)
 Joe Diffie, country singer (b. 1958)
 March 30 
Tomie dePaola, children's author and illustrator (b. 1934)
Bill Withers, American singer-songwriter and musician (b. 1938)

April 

 April 1 
Anne Hendricks Bass, investor and philanthropist (b. 1941)
Cristina, singer (b. 1959)
David Driskell, visual artist and academic (b. 1931)
Kevin Duffy, jurist (b. 1933)
Ed Farmer, baseball player (b. 1949)
Edward L. Feightner, Navy officer and flying ace (b. 1919)
Ellis Marsalis Jr., jazz pianist (b. 1934)
Bucky Pizzarelli, jazz guitarist (b. 1926)
Adam Schlesinger, musician (b. 1967) 
 April 4 – Tom Dempsey, American professional football player (b. 1947)
 April 5 – Bobby Mitchell, American Hall of Fame professional football player. (b. 1935)
 April 6
 James Drury, American actor (b. 1934)
 Al Kaline, American professional baseball player, announcer, and executive (Detroit Tigers) (b. 1934)
 Fred Singer, Austrian-born American physicist (b. 1924)
 April 7
 John Prine, folk singer (b. 1946)
 Herb Stempel, game show contestant (b. 1926)
 April 8 – Norman I. Platnick, American arachnologist and curator (b. 1951)
 April 12 – Tarvaris Jackson, NFL Quarterback (b. 1983)
 April 14 – Hank Steinbrenner, American businessman and part owner of the New York Yankees (b. 1957)
 April 15
 Allen Daviau, American cinematographer (b. 1942)
 Brian Dennehy, American actor (b. 1938)
 Lee Konitz, American composer and alto saxophonist (b. 1927)
 April 16 
 Gene Deitch, American-born Czech illustrator, animator, and comics artist (b. 1924)
 Howard Finkel, American wrestling ring announcer (b. 1950)
 April 18 – Paul H. O'Neill, American politician (b. 1935)
 April 20 – Tom Lester, American actor and evangelist (b. 1938)
 April 21 – Dimitri Diatchenko, American actor (b. 1968)
 April 22
 Vanessa Guillen, soldier, murder victim (b. 1999)
 Shirley Knight, actress (b. 1936)
 April 27
 Lynn Harrell, classical cellist (b. 1944)
 Troy Sneed, gospel musician (b. 1967)
 April 30 – Sam Lloyd, American actor, singer, and musician (b. 1963)

May 

 May 3 – John Ericson, German-American actor (b. 1926)
 May 4 
 Michael McClure, American poet and playwright (b. 1932)
 Don Shula, American football player and coach (b. 1930)
 May 7 – Mike Storen, American sports executive in basketball, baseball, and football.(b. 1935)
 May 8 – Roy Horn, German-American magician (b. 1944)
 May 9 – Little Richard, American singer, songwriter, and musician (b. 1932)
 May 10 – Betty Wright, American soul and R&B singer (b. 1953)
 May 11 – Jerry Stiller, American actor and comedian (b. 1927)
 May 14
 Phyllis George, American businesswoman, actress, and sportscaster (b. 1949)
 Bob Watson, American professional baseball player and sports executive (b. 1946)
 May 15
 Lynn Shelton, American filmmaker (b. 1965)
 Fred Willard, American actor and comedian (b. 1939)
 May 17
 Shad Gaspard, American professional wrestler and actor (b. 1981)
 Lucky Peterson, American blues singer and musician (b. 1964)
 May 19 – Ravi Zacharias, Indian-born Canadian-American Christian apologist (b. 1946)
 May 21 – Oliver E. Williamson, American economist (b. 1932)
 May 22 – Jerry Sloan, American basketball player and coach (b. 1942)
 May 24 – Jimmy Cobb, American jazz drummer (b. 1929)
 May 25 – George Floyd, American truck driver and security guard, murder victim (b. 1973)
 May 26 – Richard Herd, American actor (b. 1932)
 May 27 – Larry Kramer, American author and LGBT rights activist (b. 1935)
 May 30 – Bobby Morrow, American athlete (b. 1935)
 May 31 – Christo, Bulgarian-American artist (b. 1935)

June 

 June 1 – Pat Dye, American football player, coach, and college athletics administrator (b. 1939)
 June 2 
 Mary Pat Gleason, actress (b. 1950)
 Wes Unseld, American Hall of Fame professional basketball player, coach and executive (b. 1946)
 June 4 – Pete Rademacher, Olympic boxing champion (b. 1928)
 June 6 – Reche Caldwell, NFL Wide Receiver (b. 1979)
 June 10 – Claudell Washington, American professional baseball outfielder (b. 1954)
 June 11
 Mel Winkler, actor (b. 1941)
 Dennis O'Neil, comic book writer (b. 1939)
 June 13 – Dick Garmaker, basketball player (b. 1932)
 June 17 – Jean Kennedy Smith, diplomat (b. 1928)
 June 19 – Carlos Ruiz Zafón, Spanish novelist (b. 1964)
 June 26 
 Kelly Asbury, film director and animator (b. 1960)
 Milton Glaser, graphic designer (b. 1929)
 June 27 – Freddy Cole, jazz singer and pianist (b. 1931)
 June 28 – Rudolfo Anaya, author (b. 1937)
 June 29 
 Johnny Mandel, composer (b. 1925)
 Carl Reiner, actor, film director and comedian (b. 1922)

July 

 July 1 – Hugh Downs, broadcaster and television personality (b. 1921)
 July 2 
 Betsy Ancker-Johnson, American plasma physicist (b. 1927)
 Christian Garrison, American writer (b. 1942)
 Jon Gilliam, American football player (b. 1938)
 Reckful, American gamer and Twitch streamer (b. 1989)
July 5 – Nick Cordero, Broadway actor and singer (Bullets Over Broadway) (A Bronx Tale) (Waitress)(b. 1978)
 July 6 
Mary Kay Letourneau, schoolteacher, convicted of having sex with a minor. Later marrying the victim, her former student (b. 1962)
 Charlie Daniels, country singer-songwriter and musician (b. 1936)
 Ronald Graham, mathematician (b. 1935)
 July 8 – Naya Rivera, actress, model and singer (b. 1987)
 July 12 – Kelly Preston, actress and model (b. 1962)
 July 13 – Grant Imahara, electrical engineer, roboticist, and television host (b. 1970)
 July 16 – Phyllis Somerville, actress (b. 1943)
 July 17
 John Lewis, civil-rights leader and politician (b. 1940)
 C. T. Vivian, minister, author and lieutenant of Martin Luther King Jr. (b. 1924)
 July 20 – Michael Brooks (political commentator), political commentator and talk show host (b. 1983)
 July 21 – Annie Ross, Scottish-American singer and actress (b. 1930)
 July 24 – Regis Philbin, actor, singer, and media personality (b. 1931)
 July 25 – John Saxon, actor (b. 1936)
 July 26 – Olivia de Havilland, British-born American actress (b. 1916)
 July 30 – Herman Cain, businessman and politician (b. 1945)

August 

 August 1 – Wilford Brimley, actor and singer (b. 1934)
 August 2 – Leon Fleisher, American pianist (b. 1928)
 August 3 – Shirley Ann Grau, American writer (b. 1929)
 August 4 – Frances Allen, American computer scientist (b. 1932)
 August 6 – Brent Scowcroft, diplomat (b. 1925)
 August 9 – Kamala, American professional wrestler (b. 1950)
 August 11 
 Russell Kirsch, American computer scientist (b. 1929)
 Trini Lopez, American singer and actor (b. 1937)
 Sumner Redstone, American media executive (b. 1923)
 August 15 – Robert Trump, younger brother of Donald Trump (b. 1948)
 August 16 – John Jairo Bedoya Jr., wrestler (b. 1977)
 August 18 – Jack Sherman, American guitarist (b. 1956)
 August 23 – Lori Nelson, American actress and model (b. 1933)
 August 26 
 Gerald Carr, American astronaut and aeronautical engineer (b. 1932)
 Joe Ruby, animator, co-creator of Scooby-Doo (b. 1933)
 August 28 – Chadwick Boseman, actor (b. 1976)
 August 29 – Clifford Robinson, American basketball player (b. 1966)
 August 31 – Tom Seaver, American baseball player (b. 1944)

September

 September 1 – Erick Morillo, Colombian-American DJ and music producer (b. 1971)
 September 2 – David Graeber, American anthropologist and anarchist author (b. 1961)
 September 4 – Gary Peacock, American jazz double-bassist (b. 1935)
 September 6 – Lou Brock, American baseball player (b. 1939)
 September 14 – Bill Gates Sr., American attorney and philanthropist (b. 1926).
 September 17 
 Terry Goodkind, American novelist (b. 1948)
 Winston Groom, American novelist (b. 1943)
 September 18 
 Stephen F. Cohen, American academic and historian (b. 1938)
 Ruth Bader Ginsburg, jurist (Supreme Court of the United States) (b. 1933)
 September 20 – Michael Chapman, American cinematographer and film director (b. 1935)
 September 21 
 Arthur Ashkin, American Nobel physicist (b. 1922)
 Tommy DeVito, American musician and singer (b. 1928)
 Jackie Stallone, American astrologer, dancer, promoter and businesswoman (b. 1921)
 September 22 – Road Warrior Animal, American professional wrestler (b. 1960)
 September 23 
 Sir Harold Evans, English-American journalist (The Sunday Times, The Week, The Guardian) and author (b. 1928)
 Gale Sayers, American Hall of Fame football player (b. 1943)
 September 29 
 Mac Davis, country singer, songwriter, and actor (b. 1942)
 Helen Reddy, singer, songwriter, and actor (b. 1941)

October

 October 2 – Bob Gibson, American baseball player (b. 1935)
 October 3 – Charlie Haeger, American baseball player (b. 1983)
 October 6
 Johnny Nash, singer-songwriter (b. 1940)
 Eddie Van Halen, Dutch-American musician and songwriter (b. 1955)
 October 8
 Whitey Ford, American baseball player (b. 1928)
 Charles Moore, American athlete (b. 1929)
 October 11 – Joe Morgan, American baseball player (b. 1943)
 October 12
 Conchata Ferrell, actress (b. 1943)
 Roberta McCain, socialite and mother of John McCain (b. 1912)
 October 14 – Rhonda Fleming, American actress (b. 1923)
 October 20 – James Randi, Canadian-American magician and skeptic (b. 1928)
 October 21 – Marge Champion, American dancer and actress (b. 1919)
 October 23 – Jerry Jeff Walker, American singer-songwriter (b. 1942)
 October 25 – Diane di Prima, American poet (b. 1934)
 October 28 – Leanza Cornett, model (Miss America 1993), TV host and actress (b. 1971)
 October 29 – Angelika Amon, Austrian-American molecular and cell biologist (b. 1967)
 October 31 – MF Doom, British-born American rapper and record producer (b. 1971)

November

 November 1
 Carol Arthur, actress (b. 1935)
 Nikki McKibbin, finalist on American Idol (b. 1978) 
November 2 – Robert Sam Anson, journalist and author (b. 1945)
November 3 – Elsa Raven, actress (b. 1929)
 November 4 – John Meyer, football player and coach (b. 1942) 
 November 5 – Len Barry, singer (b. 1942)
November 6 
 Ken Spears, writer (b. 1938)
 King Von, rapper (b. 1994)
 November 7 – Norm Crosby, actor and comedian (b. 1927)
 November 8 – Alex Trebek, Canadian-born game show host (Jeopardy!) (b. 1940)
 November 10 – Tom Heinsohn, Hall of Fame basketball player, coach, and broadcaster (b. 1934)
 November 17 – Walt Davis, American athlete (b. 1931)
 November 23 
 Abby Dalton, American actress (b. 1932)
 David Dinkins, American politician, lawyer, and author (b. 1927)
 Hal Ketchum, American country singer-songwriter (b. 1953)
 November 27 – Tony Hsieh, Internet entrepreneur (b. 1973)

December

 December 1 – Arnie Robinson, American athlete (b. 1948)
 December 2
 Rafer Johnson, American athlete (b. 1935)
 Pat Patterson, Canadian-born American wrestler (b. 1941)
 Pamela Tiffin, American actress and model (b. 1942)
 December 4 – David Lander, American actor (Laverne & Shirley) (b. 1947)
 December 5 – Martin Sandoval, politician (b. 1964)
 December 6 – Paul Sarbanes, American politician and attorney (b. 1933)
 December 7 – Chuck Yeager, first pilot to break the sound barrier (b. 1923)
 December 9 – Ray Perkins, American football player and coach (b. 1941)
 December 10
 Tommy Lister Jr., actor and professional wrestler (b. 1958)
 Brandon Bernard, murderer (b. 1980)
 December 12 – Charley Pride, American singer, musician and guitarist (b. 1934)
 December 16 – Lorenzo Taliaferro, football player (b. 1991)
 December 20 – Ezra Vogel, American sociologist (b. 1930)
 December 21 – Kevin Greene, hall of fame football player (b. 1962)
 December 22 – Leslie West, guitarist and songwriter (b. 1945)
 December 23 – Frankie Randall, boxer (b. 1961)
 December 25 – Barry Lopez, author (b. 1945)
 December 26 – Brodie Lee, professional wrestler and actor (b. 1979)
 December 29 – Joe Louis Clark, educator (b. 1938)
 December 30 – Samuel Little, American serial killer; the confirmed most prolific serial killer U.S. history (b. 1940) 
 December 31 – Dick Thornburgh, Governor of Pennsylvania (1979–1987) and United States Attorney General (1988–1991) (b. 1932)

See also

2020 in United States politics and government
2020 United States presidential election
 2020 in politics and government
 2020 in American music
 2020 in American soccer
 2020 in American television
 List of American films of 2020

Country overviews

 United States
 History of United States
 History of modern United States
 Outline of United States
 Government of United States
 Politics of United States
 Years in United States
 Timeline of United States history

Related timelines for current period

 2020
 2020s
2020s in political history
2020s in United States political history
2020 in New York City

Specific situations and issues

 First impeachment of Donald Trump
 COVID-19 pandemic in the United States
 George Floyd protests
 2020 United States Postal Service crisis
 2020–2021 United States racial unrest

References

External links
 

 
2020s in the United States
United States
United States
Years of the 21st century in the United States